Jim Hannula (born July 2, 1959) is a former American football tackle. He played for the Cincinnati Bengals in 1983.

References

1959 births
Living people
Sportspeople from Elgin, Illinois
Players of American football from Illinois
American football tackles
Northern Illinois Huskies football players
Cincinnati Bengals players